Mike's Hard Lemonade Co. is an alcopop supplier based in Levittown, Pennsylvania. It is part of Badlands Beverage Brands, Inc. as of 2017. Founded in 1999, Mike's Hard Lemonade Co. defined the $3.2 billion flavored malt beverage category with the introduction of its new-to-market Mike's Hard Lemonade. Mike's partnered with the  USO in 2018, donating $250k

References

External links
 

Lemonade
Flavored malt beverages
Alcopops